Prudential may refer to:

Companies
 Prudential plc, a British multinational insurance company
 Prudential BSN Takaful, a Malaysian takaful company
 ICICI Prudential Life Insurance, an Indian company
 Prudential Financial, an American financial products and services company
 Prudential Securities, former financial services arm of Prudential Financial
 Prudential Bank Limited, a private commercial bank in Ghana
 Prudential Overall Supply, an American laundry and cleanroom company headquartered in Irvine, California, US
 Prudential Steamship Corporation, a defunct American shipping company

Buildings and structures
 Prudential (Guaranty) Building, Buffalo, New York, US
 Prudential Assurance Building (disambiguation), two buildings in England
 Prudential Center (disambiguation), several structures in the United States
 Prudential Headquarters, several buildings in Newark, New Jersey, US
 Prudential House, a skyscraper in Warsaw, Poland
 Prudential Tower, a skyscraper in Boston, Massachusetts, US
 Prudential station, an underground light rail stop
 Prudential Tunnel, a highway tunnel
 Prudential Tower (Tokyo), a skyscraper in Nagatachō, Tokyo, Japan
 Houston Main Building, formerly the Prudential Building, a demolished skyscraper in Houston, Texas, US

Sport
 Prudential Trophy, a One Day International cricket competition in England 1972–1982
 Prudential World Cup, the name of the first three Cricket World Cups

See also